Stonerstown is a census-designated place in Liberty Township, Bedford County, Pennsylvania,  United States. The population was 376 as of the 2010 census. It is located just to the west of the borough of Saxton along Pennsylvania Route 913.

References

Populated places in Bedford County, Pennsylvania
Census-designated places in Pennsylvania